Guo Quan (born 1968) is a Chinese human rights activist. He founded the China New Democracy Party. He is a State Owned Enterprise cadre, secretary of the Nanjing Economic Restructuring Commission and Nanjing People's Court cadre.

In 1996 he earned a master's degree from Nanjing University's Sociology Department. In 1999 he received a PhD in philosophy from Nanjing University. From 1999–2001 he was a post-doctorate researcher at Nanjing Normal University.

In 2001 he was retained as a professor and PhD candidate advisor at Nanjing Normal University. He is also a researcher in the Nanjing Massacre Research Center.

Legal actions against Yahoo and Google 
In early 2008, Guo Quan, announced plans to sue Yahoo! (Chief Executive Jerry Yang) and Google in the United States for having blocked his name from search results in China.

Open letters to Hu Jintao 
On 14 November 2007, Professor Guo Quan published an open letter to Chinese communist leaders  Hu Jintao and Wu Bangguo, calling for a "democratic  government based on multi-party elections that serves the interests of the common folks."

Police harassments and arrests 
Guo's very public open letters to President Hu Jintao demanding multi-party elections and the depoliticisation of the People's Liberation Army, was widely published in the internet blogosphere as well as the tradition media. Since then the Chinese cyber-police had begun to black out his blogs.

On 21 May 2008 Jonathan Watts of The Guardian reported: Chinese police have detained Guo Quan, a political dissident who criticized the government's handling of the Sichuan earthquake. Guo was seized outside his home by seven or eight police officers on 17 May 2008. They searched his house and confiscated his computer 

On 6 Feb 2008 Guo Quan told Jane Macartney, of The Times that the Chinese Yahoo! site had also blocked his name, and as a result was planning on suing Yahoo! as well.

The PEN American Center wrote:

On 13 Nov 2008 cnews reported that Guo Quan, was arrested Thursday in the city of Nanjing. According to his wife, the police's charge was "subversion of state power". Chinese police routinely uses the charge of "subversion of state power" to imprison dissidents for years. On 17 Oct 2009, Reuters reported that he was sentenced to 10 years in prison. He has been described as a political prisoner.

See also 
Jiang Lijun
Shi Tao
Wang Xiaoning
Hanfu

References

External links 
China New Democracy Party
Chinese reporter targets Yahoo! from prison cell By Chris Williams, 11 June 2007 theregister.co.uk

1968 births
Living people
Chinese dissidents
Chinese democracy activists
Chinese human rights activists
Prisoners and detainees of China
Prisoners and detainees of the People's Republic of China